This is a list of organic food topics. Organic foods are foods that are produced using methods of organic farming – that do not involve modern synthetic inputs such as synthetic pesticides and chemical fertilizers. Organic foods are also not processed using irradiation, industrial solvents, or chemical food additives.

Organic food topics

0-9
 4th Street Food Co-op

A
 Alb-Leisa
 Animal, Vegetable, Miracle: A Year of Food Life
 Amy's Kitchen
 Annie's Homegrown

B
 Bloom Agro

C
 Central Market (Texas)
 Certified Naturally Grown
 Choices Market

D
 Dancing Deer Baking Co.

E

 Earth Fare
 ECOCERT
 Eden Foods Inc.
 Enabavi
 Erewhon Organic Cereal
 EU-Eco-regulation

G
 George Street Co-op
 Green & Black's

H
 Happy Family (food company)
 Health food store

I
 Irish Organic Farmers and Growers Association

J
 Jordans (company)

K
 Kallø

L
 List of organic gardening and farming topics
 Lotus Foods

M
 Organic milk

N

 National Organic Program
 National Organic Standards Board
Natural food
 Nature's Path
 Restaurant Nora
 Northland Organic Foods Corporation
 Numi Organic Tea

O

 Organic aquaculture
 Organic beef
 Organic certification
 Organic coffee
 Organic farming
 Organic Farming Digest
 Organic food
 Organic Food Development Center
 Organic Foods Production Act of 1990
 Organic horticulture
 Organic infant formula
 Organic movement
 Organic Trade Association
 Organic Valley
 Organic wild
 Organically Grown Company
 Organic food culture

P
 PCC Natural Markets
 People's Food Co-op (Portland)
 Plum Baby
 Price-Pottenger Nutrition Foundation

Q
 Quality Assurance International

R
 Rachel's Organic
 Rainbow Grocery Cooperative

S
 Soil Association
 Soil conditioner
 Soil steam sterilization
 Sprouts Farmers Market
 Square One Organic Vodka
 Stonyfield Farm
 SunOpta

T
 The Fresh Market
 Theo Chocolate

U
 United Natural Foods

V
 Vegan organic gardening
 Vegetable box scheme

W

 Weaver Street Market
 Wedge Community Co-op
 Weston A. Price Foundation
 Whole Foods Co-op
 Whole Foods Market
 Wild Oats Markets
 Willy Street Cooperative
 Wine (organic)

Y
 Ypsilanti Food Co-op

References

See also

Organic food
Food- and drink-related lists